Tanja-Helena Dessislava Bergkvist (born January 3, 1974, in Lund) is a Swedish mathematician and blogger. She earned a Ph.D. in mathematics in 2007 at Stockholm University, and has served as a professor at the KTH Royal Institute of Technology, Uppsala University, and the Sigtunaskolan Humanistiska Läroverket. She has also worked as a researcher at the Swedish Defence Research Agency. She has gained notoriety for her conservative approach towards gender studies.

References 

1974 births
Living people
Swedish mathematicians
Swedish women mathematicians
Stockholm University alumni
Academic staff of the KTH Royal Institute of Technology
Academic staff of Uppsala University
Swedish bloggers
Swedish educators
Swedish women bloggers
Swedish women educators